The Vamp is a lost 1918 American silent wartime comedy-drama film directed by Jerome Storm and starring Enid Bennett and Douglas MacLean. It was produced by Thomas H. Ince with distribution by Paramount Pictures.

Cast
 Enid Bennett as Nancy Lyons
 Douglas MacLean as Robert Walsham
 Charles K. French as James Walsham
 Robert McKim as Phil Weil
 Melbourne MacDowell as Mr Fleming
 J. P. Lockney as Manus Mulligan

References

External links
 
 

1918 films
1918 comedy films
1918 war films
1918 lost films
American black-and-white films
1910s war comedy-drama films
American silent feature films
American war comedy-drama films
Films directed by Jerome Storm
Lost American films
Paramount Pictures films
1910s American films
Silent American comedy-drama films
1910s English-language films
Silent war films